Psoloptera is a genus of moths in the subfamily Arctiinae.

Species
 Psoloptera aurifera Herrich-Schäffer, 1854
 Psoloptera basifulva Schaus, 1894
 Psoloptera leucosticta Hübner, 1827
 Psoloptera locotmemica Bryk, 1953
 Psoloptera melini Bryk, 1953
 Psoloptera thoracica Walker, 1854

References

Natural History Museum Lepidoptera generic names catalog

Euchromiina
Moth genera